The ICF Canoe Ocean Racing World Championships are an international event involving long distance surf ski ocean races. Races are divided into single-paddler (SS1) senior, junior and masters age-group categories. The Championships have been held every two years since debuting in 2013.

Editions 
 2013:  Vila Do Conde, Portugal
 2015:  Tahiti, French Polynesia
 2017:  Hong Kong
 2019:  Saint-Pierre-Quiberon, France
 2021:  Lanzarote, Spain
 2022:  Viana do Castelo, Portugal

Medalists  
Senior category medalists are listed below:

SS1-MS - Surf Ski Men Senior

SS1-WS - Surf Ski Women Senior

Notes

References

Recurring sporting events established in 2013
World championships in canoeing and kayaking